Abiodun Adegoke is a  tall Nigerian basketball player who is currently notable for being the tallest basketball player alongside Sun Mingming. Referred to as "Big Naija", Adegoke's age is of controversy as a news report stated his age as 17 and 2.18 meters tall in the year 2016, so according to that information he is 23 or 24 years old. At that time he had size 53 feet but the biggest shoe that he could find after much searching was a size 50.

For a while, he attended the Segun Odegbami International College and Sports Academy in Wasinmi, Nigeria. Adegoke currently plays in the MPAC Elite Youth League in Dubai.

A video from Shaquille O'Neal has garnered NBA interest in March 2021 and would make Adegoke the tallest player to be drafted into the league.

References

Year of birth missing (living people)
Living people
Nigerian men's basketball players